One Knoxville Sporting Club is an American soccer team based in Knoxville, Tennessee that competes in USL League One, the third tier of the United States soccer league system.

History

USL League Two

The club was initially unveiled as Knox Pro Soccer starting as a semi-professional USL League Two club with the goal to eventually move to the professional USL League One in the future. The official name for the team, One Knoxville Sporting Club, was announced on July 15, 2021. The official crest for the team, designed by artist Matthew Wolff, was unveiled on August 19, 2021. Mark McKeever was appointed as the club's first ever head coach on January 13, 2021.

The team made their USL2 debut on May 14, 2022 hosting Asheville City SC, where they were defeated by a score of 2–1 in front of 2200 spectators. They recorded their first victory in their next match on May 17, defeating the Tri-Cities Otters by a score of 1–0. In their inaugural season, they won the South Central Division, with an 11–1–2 record, advancing to the playoffs. After winning their first two playoff rounds, the club was defeated by North Carolina Fusion U23 in the South Conference Finals (league quarterfinals).

USL League One
On October 20, 2022, it was announced that the club would move up to the fully professional level, joining USL League One. The club also announced that all of the team's 15 home games would by played at Regal Stadium, home of the Tennessee Lady Volunteers.

The club announced their first professional signing on December 12, 2022, forward Ilija Ilić, who will also serve as assistant coach.

Players and staff

Current roster

Club management

Record

References 

Association football clubs established in 2021
Soccer clubs in Tennessee
USL League One teams
USL League Two teams
Sports in Knoxville, Tennessee
2021 establishments in Tennessee
One Knoxville SC